Maera is a genus of crustacean in the family Maeridae, and was first described by William Elford Leach in 1814. It consists of  the following species:

 Maera anoculata
 Maera bousfieldi
 Maera danae
 Maera edwardsi
 Maera fusca
 Maera grossimana
 Maera hirondellei
 Maera irregularis
 Maera jerrica
 Maera loveni
 Maera lucinae
 Maera nelsonae
 Maera pachytelson
 Maera schieckei
 Maera similis
 Maera sodalis
 Maera spinimana
 Maera tenera
 Maera umarae

References

Malacostraca genera
Maeridae
Taxa named by William Elford Leach
Taxa described in 1814